Meladema is a genus of beetles in family Dytiscidae. It contains the following species (among others):

 Meladema coriacea Laporte, 1835
 Meladema imbricata (Wollaston, 1871)
 Meladema lanio (Fabricius, 1775)

References

Dytiscidae genera
Taxonomy articles created by Polbot